Micropterix cypriensis is a species of moth belonging to the family Micropterigidae, and was first described by John Heath in 1985 from specimens collected in Cyprus. The holotype male was collected from Yermasoyia, Limassol on 11 March 1979 and is now in the Natural History Museum, Stockholm. It was thought to be the first time a Micropterix had been recorded on Cyprus and it is an endemic species of that island.

References

External links
 lepiforum.de
 Fauna Europaea

Micropterigidae
Endemic fauna of Cyprus
Invertebrates of Cyprus
Moths of Europe
Moths described in 1985